In digital electronics, analogue electronics and entertainment, the user interface may include media controls or player controls, to enact and change or adjust the process of video playback, audio playback, and alike. These controls are commonly depicted as widely known symbols found in a multitude of products, exemplifying what is known as dominant design.

Symbols

Media control symbols are commonly found on both software and physical media players, remote controls, and multimedia keyboards. Their application is described in ISO/IEC 18035.

The main symbols date back to the 1960s, with the Pause symbol having reportedly been invented at Ampex during that decade for use on reel-to-reel audio recorder controls, due to the difficulty of translating the word "pause" into some languages used in foreign markets. The Pause symbol was designed as a combination of the existing square Stop symbol and the caesura, and was intended to evoke the concept of an interruption or "stutter stop".

In popular culture

Consumer products 
The Play symbol is arguably the most widely used of the media control symbols. In many ways, this symbol has become synonymous with music culture and more broadly the digital download era. As such, there are now a multitude of items such as T-shirts, posters, and tattoos that feature this symbol. Similar cultural references can be observed with the Power symbol which is especially popular among video gamers and technology enthusiasts.

Branding 
Media symbols can be found on an array of advertisements: from live music venues to streaming services.

In 2012, Google rebranded its digital download store to Google Play, using the Play symbol in its logo. The Play symbol also serves as a logo for YouTube since 2017. Television station owners Morgan Murphy Media and TEGNA have begun to institute the Play symbol into the logos of their stations to further connect their websites to their over-the-air television presences.

Use on appliances and other mechanical devices 

In recent years, there has been a proliferation of electronics that use media control symbols in order to represent the Run, Stop, and Pause functions. Likewise, user interface programing pertaining to these functions has also been influenced by that of media players.

For example, some washers and dryers with an illuminated Play/pause button are programmed such that it stays lit when the appliance is running. A line of Philips pasta makers has the Play/pause button for controlling the pasta-making process.

See also
 List of international common standards
 Power symbol
 Miscellaneous Technical

References

Audio electronics
Symbols
Video hardware